Clappia umbilicata, the umbilicate pebblesnail, was a species of small freshwater snail that had an operculum, an aquatic gastropod mollusk in the family Lithoglyphidae. This species is now extinct.

Distribution 
This species was endemic to the State of Alabama in the United States. The type locality is the Coosa River at Wetumpka, Alabama.

The distribution of this species used to include: Coosa River at Duncan's Ripple, The Bar and Higgin's Ferry in Chilton County; and Butting Ram Shoals in Coosa County, Alabama.

Description 
This species was discovered and described under the name Somatogyrus umbilicatus by the American malacologist Bryant Walker in 1904. Walker's type description reads as follows:

The color of Clappia umbilicata was black. This presumably means that the whole animal including snout, nape, mantle and foot were black. The black color of the mantle was verified by Thompson (1984).

Clappia umbilicata has 56-59 rows of teeth on its radula. Each row has 6-7 central basocones, 6-7 central octocones, 18-21 lateral teeth, ca. 50 inner marginal teeth and ca. 35 outer marginal teeth.

Ecology 

The natural habitat of this species was rivers. Clappia umbilicata inhabited only the rapidly flowing sections of river shoals. The snail died out because of silting of its habitat after the dam was constructed in 1928. (Also see Jordan Dam and Jordan Lake).

Based on examination of the radula, Thompson (1984) hypothesized that Clappia umbilicata grazed on fine particles of plants, specializing on finer-sized particles than those consumed by snails in the genus Somatogyrus.

References 
This article incorporates public domain text from reference

External links 

Lithoglyphidae
Extinct gastropods
Taxonomy articles created by Polbot